Tidewater Council is a local council of the Boy Scouts of America (BSA). It serves the region of southeastern Virginia and north-eastern North Carolina.  This region is often referred to as South Hampton Roads or the Tidewater or Tidewater Virginia area; hence the name of the council. Its Order of the Arrow counterpart is the Blue Heron Lodge; which was founded in 1946 when a team from Octoraro Lodge in Pennsylvania inducted the first members of Blue Heron Lodge.

Organization
Tidewater Council is divided into four districts:

History

The Tidewater Council was founded in 1911 as the Norfolk Council, changing its name in 1935 to its current name. In 1916, the Portsmouth Council (#597) was founded, changing its name to the Portsmouth Area Council in 1924. Portsmouth merged with the Norfolk Council in 1930.

Pipsico Scout Reservation

Pipsico Scout Reservation is located in Surry County, Virginia between Surry and Spring Grove on the banks of the James River. Pipsico is subdivided into four camps: Camp Lions, Camp Kiwanis, Camp Rotary and Camp Powhatan.

Pipsico offers year-round Scouting opportunities in one of our four Scout camps as well as a summer camp and high adventure experience during the summer.  Summer camp activities include: Scoutcraft, climbing and rappelling tower, shooting sports, aquatics, hiking trails, a 17th-century archaeological dig site and handicrafts. In October 2008, Pipsico celebrated its 50th anniversary and included staff members from 1958 to 2008 as part of the celebration.

The James River Adventure Base at Pipsico Scout Reservation programs include a week-long scuba diving program, a week-long sailing program, and the ultimate experience of a week-long adventure program called PEX.

Order of the Arrow

Blue Heron Lodge #349 is the local chapter of the Order of the Arrow affiliated with Tidewater Council. In 1946, the council formed an Order of the Arrow lodge when ceremonialists from Octoraro Lodge #22 inducted the first members. In 1947, the totem of a blue heron was selected and the lodge was named Blue Heron Lodge #349.

See also
Scouting in Virginia

References

Local councils of the Boy Scouts of America
Youth organizations based in Virginia
Southern Region (Boy Scouts of America)
1911 establishments in Virginia